Goldman's broad-clawed shrew (Cryptotis goldmani) is a species of mammal in the family Soricidae. It is found in Guatemala and Mexico.

References

Cryptotis
Mammals of Central America
Mammals of Mexico
Taxonomy articles created by Polbot